Frank Beckwith may refer to:

 Francis J. Beckwith (born 1960), American philosopher, Christian apologist and scholar
 Frank R. Beckwith (1904–1965), African American lawyer and civil rights activist